Elhadji Babacar Khouma (born 17 March 1993), known as Khouma Babacar, is a Senegalese professional footballer who plays as a striker for Danish club Copenhagen.

Club career
Born in Thiès, Babacar began his career in the academy of US Rail in his hometown. Two years later, aged only 14, he moved to Italy and signed with Delfino Pescara 1936 after a successful trial.

In July 2008, Babacar signed with another club in the latter country, ACF Fiorentina, after also being tracked by another Serie A side, Genoa CFC. In the 2009–10 season he began training with the first team, coached by Cesare Prandelli.

On 14 January 2010, at the age of 16 years and 10 months, Babacar made his official debut for the Viola, starting against A.C. ChievoVerona in the Coppa Italia and scoring the 2–2 equaliser in the 75th minute of an eventual 3–2 home win. He scored his first league goal on 20 March, netting the third in a 3–0 home victory over Genoa.

On 31 January 2012, Babacar was loaned to Spain's Racing de Santander. He maiden appearance in La Liga took place 11 days later, when he came on as late substitute in a 0–0 home draw against Atlético Madrid.

Babacar netted ten times in 22 matches in the 2016–17 campaign, helping his team finish in eighth place. In January 2018, he joined U.S. Sassuolo Calcio on loan until 30 June as part of a swap deal involving Diego Falcinelli – his new club also secured an option to sign him permanently.

On 2 September 2019, Babacar was loaned to newly promoted U.S. Lecce on a season-long move.

On 21 January 2022, he signed a contract with Danish club Copenhagen until the summer of 2025.

International career
Babacar made his debut for Senegal on 27 March 2017, playing the second half of a 1–1 friendly draw with Ivory Coast that had to be abandoned in the 88th minute due to crowd trouble.

Career statistics

Club

Honours
Copenhagen
 Danish Superliga: 2021–22

References

External links

Gazzetta dello Sport profile  

1993 births
Living people
Sportspeople from Thiès
Senegalese footballers
Association football forwards
US Rail players
Serie A players
Serie B players
ACF Fiorentina players
Calcio Padova players
Modena F.C. players
U.S. Sassuolo Calcio players
U.S. Lecce players
La Liga players
Racing de Santander players
Süper Lig players
Alanyaspor footballers
F.C. Copenhagen players
Senegal youth international footballers
Senegal international footballers
Senegalese expatriate footballers
Expatriate footballers in Italy
Expatriate footballers in Spain
Expatriate footballers in Turkey
Expatriate men's footballers in Denmark
Senegalese expatriate sportspeople in Italy
Senegalese expatriate sportspeople in Spain
Senegalese expatriate sportspeople in Turkey
Senegalese expatriate sportspeople in Denmark